Jinae Station is a station of the BGLRT Line of Busan Metro in Jinae-dong, Gimhae, South Korea.

Station Layout

Exits

References

External links
  Cyber station information from Busan Transportation Corporation

Busan Metro stations
Busan–Gimhae Light Rail Transit
Metro stations in Gimhae
Railway stations opened in 2011